The 2016 Birmingham City Council election took place on 5 May 2016 to elect one third of the members of Birmingham City Council in England. The election was held on the same day as the election of a Police and Crime Commissioner for the West Midlands as part of the 2016 Police and Crime Commissioner elections.

Labour increased their hold on the City Council, winning 30 of the 40 seats up for election, gaining 1 from the Conservatives and 1 from the Liberal Democrats as well as retaining 1 previously vacant seat formerly held by a Labour Councillor.

Result

Ward results

Acocks Green

Aston

Bartley Green

Billesley

Bordesley Green

Bournville

Brandwood

Edgbaston

Erdington

Hall Green

Handsworth Wood

Harborne

Hodge Hill

Kings Norton

Kingstanding

Ladywood

Longbridge

Lozells and East Handsworth

Moseley and Kings Heath

Nechells

Northfield

Oscott

Perry Barr

Quinton

Selly Oak

Shard End

Sheldon

Soho

South Yardley

Sparkbrook

Springfield

Stechford and Yardley North

Stockland Green

Sutton Four Oaks

Sutton New Hall

Sutton Trinity

Sutton Vesey

Tyburn

Washwood Heath

Weoley

Notes

References

2016 English local elections
2016
2010s in Birmingham, West Midlands